Zaki is a given name and surname.

Zaki may also refer to:

Zaki, Nigeria, local government area of Bauchi State
Kafin Zaki Dam, proposed reservoir in Bauchi State, Nigeria
Żaki, village in Poland
Borowskie Żaki, village in Poland
Pieńki-Żaki, village in Poland
Szepietowo-Żaki, village in Poland
Zaki Gordon Institute, film school in Arizona